Elvera "Baby" Sanchez Davis (September 1, 1905 – September 2, 2000) was an American dancer and the mother of Sammy Davis Jr.

Davis Jr. stated that his mother was Puerto Rican and born in San Juan; however, in the 2003 biography In Black and White, author Wil Haygood wrote that Davis' mother was born in New York City, of Afro-Cuban descent, and that Davis claimed she was Puerto Rican because he feared anti-Cuban backlash would hurt his record sales.

Life and career
Elvera Sanchez was born in New York City to Cuban immigrants Luisa Valentina (née Aguiar) and Marco Sanchez. She began her career as a chorus-line dancer at the Lafayette Theater in Harlem, in 1921. She became known as "Baby Sanchez", and married Sammy Davis Sr., also a dancer, in 1923. In 1925 their son and only child, Sammy Davis Jr., was born. He would often accompany his mother and father to the theater. When Sammy Jr. was three, his parents split up and his father obtained sole custody of him, taking him on the road. Sanchez was a chorus-line dancer at Apollo Theater for six years and appeared in Oscar Micheaux’s 1938 film Swing. She continued to dance until the 1940s.

After retiring from her show business career at the age of 35, she began working as a barmaid for Grace's Little Belmont in Atlantic City, New Jersey. She enjoyed telling jokes to customers and was known for sporting a gold napkin. Her connections with entertainers Count Basie, Billy Eckstine, and Sarah Vaughan drew these and other celebrities to her station, and her son Sammy would come to visit after performing across town at the 500 Club "and delighted everyone, pouring drinks and singing". Frank Sinatra's valet George Jacobs recalled in his memoirs that Sinatra also liked to drop by Grace's Little Belmont in the early morning hours after his shows at the 500 Club to say hello to Davis' mother behind the bar.

From 1989, until her death in 2000, she was an adviser to the New York Committee to Celebrate National Tap Dance Day. She was also survived by a daughter, Ramona.

References

Sources

External links
Obituary printed in Jet Magazine
Elvera Sanchez on Find A Grave

1905 births
2000 deaths
African-American female dancers
American tap dancers
Dancers from New York (state)
Vaudeville performers
Entertainers from New York City
Sammy Davis Jr.
American entertainers of Cuban descent
Hispanic and Latino American dancers
African-American women musicians